Maracha District is a district in the West Nile sub-region, in the Northern Region of Uganda. It was formed in 2006 from Arua District.

History
Initially, the counties of Maracha and Terego were removed from Arua District to form a new, single district, which was also known as Maracha–Terego District or Nyadri District. From the district's inception, where to locate its headquarters had been a contentious issue. In February 2007, one group of elected officials from the district asked a court to block the location of the new district headquarters in an opposing location. After nearly five years of disagreement, Terego County opted to return to Arua District and Maracha County went on to form the new district on its own.

Location
The district is bordered by Koboko District to the north, Yumbe District to the north-east, and Terego District to the east and Arua City to the south. The Democratic Republic of the Congo is west of Maracha District. The coordinates of the district are 03 17N, 30 56E. (Latitude:3.28750; Longitude:30.94000).

Population
In 1991, the national population census estimated the population of the district at 107,600. The 2002 national census estimated the population at 145,700. In 2014, the national population census enumerated the population at 186,134.

Economy

Crops raised include:
 Avocado
 Beans
 Cassava
 Flowers
 Groundnuts
 Maize
 Mangoes
 Matooke
 Millet
 Sesame
 Tobacco

In addition to crops, the following animals are reared for food at home and for sale in the towns: African goats, bees for honey, Boer goats, chicken for eggs and meat, fish, and pigs.

Notable people 
 Abdulatif Tiyua, military officer and former rebel leader

See also
 Maracha Town
 Alikua Pyramid
 Lugbara cuisine

References

External links
  Maracha children leave school to sell drugs

 
West Nile sub-region
Districts of Uganda
Northern Region, Uganda